This is a timeline of deaths caused by rockets, missiles and gunfire in Israel and Palestine in 2012 as part of the Israeli–Palestinian conflict.

1 January to 23 October 

Total: 72+

Palestinians: 70+

Israelis: 1

24–27 October

Total: 6

Palestinians: 6

Israelis: 0

29 October to 1 November

Total: 1

Palestinians: 1

Israelis: 0

2 November to 5 November

Total: 2

Palestinians: 2

Israelis: 0

6 November to 7 November

Total:

8 November to 10 November

Total: 7

Palestinians: 80 (69 children)

Israelis: 1

11 November to 13 November

Total:

14 November

This was the first day of Operation Pillar of Cloud

Palestinians: 13 (including 2-3 children and 1 woman)

Israelis: 0

15 November and 21 November

Total: 100+

Palestinians: 100+ (including 23+ children and 10+ women)

Israelis: 5 (4 civilians, one soldier)

See also

References 

2012 in Israel
2012 in the Palestinian territories
Israeli-Palestinian conflict
Israeli-Palestinian conflict
2012
2012
2012
Terrorist incidents in Israel in 2012
2012